In the United States, a sophomore ( or ) is a person in the second year at an educational institution; usually at a secondary school or at the college and university level, but also in other forms of post-secondary educational institutions. In high school a sophomore is equivalent to a tenth grade or Class-10 student.

In sports, sophomore may also refer to a professional athlete in their second season.

High school
The 10th grade is the second year of a student's high school period (usually aged 15–16) and is referred to as sophomore year, so in a four year course the stages are freshman, sophomore, junior and senior.

In How to Read a Book, the Aristotelean philosopher and founder of the "Great Books of the Western World" program Mortimer Adler says, "There have always been literate ignoramuses, who have read too widely, and not well. The Greeks had a name for such a mixture of learning and folly which might be applied to the bookish but poorly read of all ages. They are all 'sophomores'."  This oxymoron points at the Greek words σοφός (wise) and μωρός (fool).

High-school sophomores are expected to begin preparing for the college application process, including increasing and focusing their extracurricular activities. Students at this level are also considered to be developing greater ability for abstract thinking.

Tertiary education 
The term sophomore is also used to refer to a student in the second year of college or university studies in the United States; typically a college sophomore is 19 to 20 years old. In the United States, college sophomores are advised to begin thinking of career options and to get involved in volunteering or social organizations on or near campus.

See also

 Freshman
 Junior (education year)
 Sophomore slump
 Second-system effect
 Senior (education)
 Sophomore's dream

References

Educational stages
Educational years
Students in the United States